

References

1985
Soviet
Films